Talasea District is a district of the West New Britain Province of Papua New Guinea.  Its capital is Kimbe.

References

Districts of Papua New Guinea
West New Britain Province